Rajpal Naurang Yadav (born 16 March 1971) is an Indian actor and comedian. His breakthrough came in Ram Gopal Varma's Jungle (2000), in which he played a negative role. He has gained widespread recognition through his comic performances over the years and has been nominated for several awards such as Filmfare and Screen Awards.

Some of his most notable work includes Ek Aur Ek Gyarah (2003), Kyaa Kool Hai Hum (2004), Mujhse Shaadi Karogi (2004), Waqt: The Race Against Time (2005), Phir Hera Pheri (2006), Partner (2007), Bhoothnath (2008), Krazzy 4 (2008), Krrish 3 (2013), Judwaa 2 (2017), Bhool Bhulaiyaa 2 (2022) and in several movies of  Priyadarshan such as Hungama (2003), Garam Masala (2005), Malamaal Weekly (2005), Chup Chup Ke (2006), Bhagam Bhag (2006), Dhol (2007), Bhool Bhulaiyaa (2008), De Dana Dan (2009), Khatta Meetha (2010).

He has starred in leading roles and serious characters including Main Madhuri Dixit Banna Chahti Hoon (2003), Main, Meri Patni Aur Woh (2005), Rama Rama Kya Hai Drama (2008), Kushti (2010) and Ardh (2022).

Career 
Yadav acted in the Doordarshan's television serial Mungeri Ke Bhai Naurangilal as the protagonist. This was the sequel to a similar television program on Doordarshan, Mungerilal Ke Haseen Sapne.

Although Yadav found success in negative roles, he preferred comic roles, as in Pyaar Tune Kya Kiya, and he went on to become a prolific comic enthusiast in Hindi films. His films include Hungama, Waqt: The Race Against Time, Chup Chup Ke, Garam Masala, Phir Hera Pheri and Dhol.

Yadav has also been the leading character in more serious films including Main Madhuri Dixit Banna Chahti Hoon, Ladies Tailor, Rama Rama Kya Hai Drama, Hello! Hum Lallan Bol Rahe Hain, Kushti, Mirch, Benny and Babloo and Main, Meri Patni Aur Woh.

For the film Jungle, he won the Sansui Screen Best actor award in a Negative Role along with a nomination for the Screen Best Actor award. He received the Yash Bharati Award for the film Main Madhuri Dixit Banna Chahti Hoon. Yadav was also given the Janpad Ratna Award.

He made his Telugu language debut in 2015 with Kick 2, and played the main antagonist in controversial filmmaker Faisal Saif's multilingual film Amma.

Personal life
Yadav married his first wife in 1992. After the birth of their first child, she died due to certain complications. He then went on to marry for a second time in 2003 after establishing himself in the industry.  He has two daughters.

Yadav was given a 10-day imprisonment in 2013 for filing a false affidavit in court. He spent four days in jail from 3 December 2013 until 6 December 2013 after which a division bench of the High Court suspended the sentence on his appeal. He was sentenced to 3 months in civil prison for non repayment of loan which he took in 2010 for his directorial debut by the Delhi High Court on 30 November 2018. He was immediately taken into custody by the Delhi Police. Subsequently, in November 2018, Delhi High Court issued a three-month prison sentence.

Filmography

Films

Web series

Television

Dubbing roles

Awards and nominations
Filmfare Awards

International Indian Film Academy Awards

Apsara Awards

Screen Awards

Zee Cine Awards

References

External links 

1971 births
Living people
Bharatendu Academy of Dramatic Arts alumni
Male actors in Marathi cinema
Male actors in Hindi cinema
Indian male comedians
National School of Drama alumni
Screen Awards winners
People from Shahjahanpur